Zooey Magazine was a boutique quarterly United States-based women's fashion and lifestyle magazine, with an emphasis on simple living. The magazine began its printed publication in 2010, having been created in 2008 by the then 14-year-old Lucia Tran. It folded in 2015.

History 
Editor-in-chief and CEO of Zooey Magazine Lucia Tran established an online magazine in 2008, and then converted the site to a print publication in 2010. Lucia based the magazine on the mission of empowering women through entertainment, which is why she named the publication Zooey, after the character Zooey Glass from J.D. Salinger's novel Franny and Zooey, who is uplifting, smart, and very capable.

Inspiration
Zooey Magazine is inspired by magazines including Interview, Bust, W, Frankie, Kinfolk, and Lula Magazine.

Past cover models 
 Issue 21: Kind Campaign
 Issue 20: Krysten Ritter
 Winter 2013: Kat Dennings
 Fall 2013: Sara Bareilles
 Summer 2013: Emma Chapman and Elsie Larson of ABeautifulMess.com blog
 Spring 2013: Mary Elizabeth Winstead
 October/November 2012: Nikki Reed
 August/September 2012: Kristen Bell
 June/July 2012: Julianne Hough
 April/May 2012: Anna Paquin
 February/March 2012: Kaley Cuoco
 December/January 2011: Emmy Rossum
 October/November 2011: Anna Kendrick
 August/September 2011: Jennifer Love Hewitt
 June/July 2011: Sophia Bush
 April/May 2011: Ashley Tisdale
 February/March 2011: Aly Michalka
 December/January 2011: Jackson Rathbone and Victoria Justice
 October 2010: Jessica Lowndes
 September 2010: Lindsey Shaw

Editor-in-chief
Lucia Tran (born May 12, 1993), an English major at UCLA who graduated in 2015, created the magazine when she was 14 years old. Lucia has been noted to have enjoyed reading magazines at an early age, sparking her interest in joining the magazine industry in later years - which led her to start her online magazine in 2008, and later launching the print publication in 2010 when she was a senior in high school.

Content
Zooey featured celebrities, fashion, art, human-interest stories, and photography with an independent ("indie") perspective while catering to an audience pursuing simple living.

References

External links
 ZooeyMagazine.com(official site) 

Defunct women's magazines published in the United States
Fashion magazines published in the United States
Lifestyle magazines published in the United States
Magazines established in 2010
Magazines disestablished in 2015
Magazines published in Los Angeles
Quarterly magazines published in the United States
Women's fashion magazines